Asad Ibn Al-Furat (c.759 – c.828) was a jurist and theologian in Ifriqiya, who played an important role in the Arab conquest of Sicily.

His family, originally from Harran in Mesopotamia, emigrated with him to Ifriqiya. Asad studied in Medina with Malik ibn Anas, the founder of the Malikite school, and in Kufa with a disciple of Abu Hanifa, the founder of the Hanafite tradition. He collected his views on religious law in the Asadiyya, which had great influence in Ifriqiya.

After his return to Ifriqiya he became a judge in Kairouan, where he soon came into conflict with the Emir Ziyadat Allah I (817-838) after criticising his luxurious and impious lifestyle. In order to get rid of this unwelcome critic, Ziyadat appointed Asad the leader of an expedition to Byzantine Sicily. In 827 Asad landed with a force of Arabs in Sicily and following a defeat of Byzantine troops proceeded to besiege Syracuse. However, the city could not be taken and Asad soon died of plague.

Asad was prominent in establishing the Malikite Madh'hab in Ifriqiya.

As a Hanafi, Asad played a major role in resolving conflicts between the Maliki in Kairouan. He was able to strengthen Hanafi legal theory as the basis of Fiqh in the Ifriqiya of the Aghlabids. Although the Maliki rite was born in Medina, Asad Ibn al-Furat and Sahnun Ibn Sa'id, founder of the Ifriqiya Maliki school, were able to reformulate it in Kairouan and later Sicily.

References
Encyclopædia Britannica

759 births
828 deaths
Spread of Islam
9th-century deaths from plague (disease)
Tunisian Muslim theologians
Arab people of the Arab–Byzantine wars
People of the Muslim conquest of Sicily
Arab scholars
9th-century Arabs
8th-century Arabs
9th-century jurists
9th-century people of Ifriqiya